John Young is a Scottish retired association football midfielder who played professionally in the Major Indoor Soccer League.

Young attended Hartwick College, where he played soccer from 1977 to 1979. In his freshman season, he was part of the Hawks' NCAA Men's Division I Soccer Championship and Young was selected as the Final Four's Offensive MVP. He was a 1979 First Team All American.

He played for the Denver Avalanche of the Major Indoor Soccer League during the 1980-1981 season.

References

External links
MISL stats

1957 births
Living people
Denver Avalanche players
Hartwick Hawks men's soccer players
Major Indoor Soccer League (1978–1992) players
Scottish footballers
Scottish expatriate footballers
Tulsa Roughnecks (1978–1984) players
Footballers from Edinburgh
All-American men's college soccer players
Association football midfielders
Scottish expatriate sportspeople in the United States
Expatriate soccer players in the United States
NCAA Division I Men's Soccer Tournament Most Outstanding Player winners